The National University of Engineering (UNI) is a public engineering and science university located in the Rímac District of Lima, Peru. It's widely considered as one of Peru's most prestigious educational institutions.

History

The National University of Engineering was founded in 1876 by the Polish engineer Edward Jan Habich as the School of Civil Constructions and Mining Engineers, but has traditionally been known as School of Engineers (Escuela de Ingenieros). At the time of its foundation, there was a growing demand for engineers in Peru due to the rapid development of mining and communications.

Today, the National University of Engineering is widely regarded as the foremost science and technology-oriented university in Peru, many of its alumni occupying today positions of leadership in the fields of Industry, Academia, and Government.

Academics

Current admission is highly competitive, with ~16% acceptance rate in 2020 overall with the most demanding study fields as Civil Engineering, Architecture, Systems Engineering, Industrial Engineering, Electronics Engineering and Electrical Engineering.

UNI is widely known for being rigorous, demanding great focus and effort from its students. Given the competition level to be accepted to the National University of Engineering and its highly demanding curricula, the university is commonly acknowledged by Peruvians as the most difficult to attend in the whole country. 
This has given UNI students recognition among Peruvians, but it has also created an imbalance sometimes regarding GPA's as compared to other schools, those of UNI's students being in some occasions lower due to the difficulty level being harder.

Notable alumni and professors
Among former renowned professors and students are:
Francisco Sagasti Hochhausler, President of Peru (2020–2021), and former Planning manager at the World Bank. Former President of the Consultive Council of Science and Technology for Development in the United Nations., visiting professor of the Wharton School of Business at University of Pennsylvania.
Martin Vizcarra Cornejo, President of Peru (2018–2020).
Manuel Prado, President of Peru (1939 - 1945) and (1956 - 1962)
Federico Villarreal, scientist, engineer and politician.
Fernando Belaúnde Terry (Professor), Architect, former President of Peru (1963–1968, 1980-5).
Alberto Benavides de la Quintana. Founder of Buenaventura Mining Company. Peruvian Billionaire. Mining Engineering, Class of 1941. Masters in Geology from Harvard University, Class of 1944.
Humberto Lay, politician
Salomón Lerner Ghitis, Prime minister.
Miguel De La Torre Sobrevilla, founder and CEO of Geoservice Ingeniería. Former president of the board of directors of International Geosynthetics Society (IGS) in Peru.
Barton Zwiebach Cantor, string theorist, author of "A First Course in String Theory" and Professor of Physics at the Massachusetts Institute of Technology. He also was awarded with the MIT School of Science 2003 Teaching Prize for Excellence in Undergraduate Education
Modesto Montoya, Nuclear physicist and former president of the Peruvian Institute for Nuclear Energy
Fernando de Szyszlo, painter, sculptor, printmaker, and teacher.
Gustavo Mohme, Civil engineer, politician and journalist.
César Gonzales, an IBM Fellow at the Thomas J. Watson Research Center and also a Fellow of the Institute of Electrical and Electronics Engineers (IEEE). He is an expert in digital image and video technologies having contributed to the development of the widely used MPEG-2 video compression standard. He also led the development of advanced semiconductor chips based on this standard which IBM sold in the digital TV broadcast and consumer electronics markets.
Edgar Perez, He is the author of The Speed Traders and Knightmare on Wall Street, and has been featured internationally on high-frequency trading, financial regulation and international economics.

Organization

The UNI is divided into eleven colleges which contain twenty-seven Academic Schools. It is a university polarized around Science, Engineering, and Architecture. It offers a wide range of engineering specialties, including traditional Industrial, Mechanical, Civil, Electronics, Chemical, and Systems Engineering, as well as other specialized majors such as Economics, Textile and Naval Engineering.

References

Sources

External links
 Universidad Nacional de Ingeniería website

 
1876 establishments in Peru
Educational institutions established in 1876